Haliotis iris, common name paua, blackfoot paua or rainbow abalone, is a species of edible sea snail, a marine gastropod mollusk in the family Haliotidae, the abalones.

Haliotis iris was originally credited to Martyn, 1784 (Univ. Conch, ii, t. 61.) but his work was invalidated in 1957 by the ICZN, opinion 456.

Distribution
This marine species is endemic to New Zealand. Blackfoot paua is the largest abalone species found in New Zealand. It is most commonly found in shallow cool waters at depths less than 6 m. The species occurs all around mainland New Zealand, Stewart Island, and the Chatham Islands. These sea snails often form large clusters in the sub-littoral zone on open, exposed coasts, where drift seaweed accumulates and there is good water movement. Blackfoot paua grow to about 180 mm in shell width.

Description
Paua belong to the molluscan genus Haliotis, more commonly known as abalones. The name Haliotis derives from Greek and means sea ear, reflecting the ear-like shape of the abalone shell. Three species of abalone occur naturally in New Zealand: blackfoot paua (Haliotis iris), yellowfoot paua (Haliotis australis), and whitefoot paua (Haliotis virginea).

The size of the shell of this species varies between 80 mm and 170 mm. "The two sides of the oval, convex shell are equally curved. The oblique spire is very short and contains two whorls and five to seven perforations. The surface is pitted. The lip is continuous and is produced beyond the body whorl. The inner surface is dark metallic blue and green, with yellow reflections. The muscle impression is distinct and roughened. The back of the shell is convex and angled at the row of perforations. The outer surface is pale brown or light olive-green, pitted as if by the intersection of two series of low oblique folds. The inside of the spire is brilliantly pearly, prussian blue and green predominating, but with reflections also of purple, orange and a little red. The columellar plate is broad, passing into the expanded continuation of the outer lip above. It is not truncate below. Its face is flattened, and slopes inward. The cavity of the spire is small."

Human use 

Haliotis iris is the only farmed species of paua found in New Zealand. That is mainly because of its size compared to its smaller relatives - the "yellow foot paua" and the even smaller "virgin paua" - which are also commonly used for jewellery arts and carvings around New Zealand. There is a worldwide trade in natural pearls from this species, which are known as Haliotis iris pearls or Paua pearls.

Notes

References 
 Geiger D.L. & Poppe G.T. (2000). A Conchological Iconography: The family Haliotidae. Conchbooks, Hackenheim Germany. 135pp 83pls
 Somerville, Gayle (2013) "Exploring harvest regulations of the New Zealand paua abalone (Haliotis iris) via population modelling" MSc thesis, University of Otago.

External links 
 photos
 

iris
Gastropods of New Zealand
Gastropods described in 1791
Taxa named by Johann Friedrich Gmelin